The Seventh Victim (German: Das siebente Opfer) is a 1964 West German thriller film directed by Franz Josef Gottlieb and starring Hansjörg Felmy, Ann Smyrner and Hans Nielsen.

The film is based on a novel by Bryan Edgar Wallace, one of several films made in an attempt to capitalize on Rialto Film's successful series of adaptions of the novels of his father, Edgar Wallace. It was shot at Spandau Studios in Berlin with sets designed by art director Hans Jürgen Kiebach and Ernst Schomer.

The film is also known by the alternative title The Racetrack Murders.

Plot summary

Cast

References

Bibliography 
 Bergfelder, Tim. International Adventures: German Popular Cinema and European Co-Productions in the 1960s. Berghahn Books, 2005.
 Goble, Alan. The Complete Index to Literary Sources in Film. Walter de Gruyter, 1999.

External links 
 
 

1964 films
1960s thriller films
German thriller films
West German films
1960s German-language films
Films directed by Franz Josef Gottlieb
Films set in England
Films based on British novels
Films set in London
German horse racing films
Films shot at Spandau Studios
1960s German films